Intime is a live album by Christophe from 2014. His third live album, it was the first to reinterpret some of his greatest hits including 1965's hits "Aline and "Les Marionnettes", and 1974's "Señorita", in acoustic versions.

Track list 
CD 1
 Comme un interdit
 Les Mots bleus
 J'l'ai pas touchée
 Aline
 Les Paradis perdus
 Les Marionnettes
 Parle-lui de moi
 La Non-demande en mariage
 La dolce vita
 Señorita
 Emporte-moi
 Petite fille du soleil
 Alcaline
 Lita
 Interlude: Mon ami Alain (hommage à Alain Bashung)
 Alcaline
 Lita
CD 2 (additional EP disc on some versions of the album)
 Elle dit
 La Petite Fille du troisième
 La Man
 Ces petits luxes
 Comm' si la terre tremblait

References

2014 albums